Fernando Edgardo Correa Ayala (born 6 January 1974) is a Uruguayan retired footballer who played as a striker, and is a current manager.

Having represented in his country River Plate and Peñarol, he had a lengthy spell in Spain with Atlético Madrid. He also competed professionally in China.

Club career
After four seasons with local Club Atlético River Plate, Montevideo-born Correa moved abroad to Atlético Madrid, making his La Liga debut on 10 September 1995 against Racing de Santander. Incidentally, he would be loaned for two years to the Cantabrians, scoring 27 league goals in that period which was enough to earn a return to the Spanish capital. There, however, he would never be more than a decent attacking backup, at least in the top level; he did form an efficient partnership with compatriot Diego Alonso in 2001–02, as the Colchoneros returned to the top tier after two years, combining for 35 league goals.

After a two-year stint with RCD Mallorca and a further six games for Real Valladolid (Segunda División), Correa returned to Uruguay and River Plate, signing for Peñarol after a short stint with China's Shanghai Shenhua FC. In 2009, the 35-year-old rejoined his first professional club.

Following his retirement, Alonso worked as assistant to Alonso in several teams. He had his first head coach experience in January 2018, being appointed at C.A. Cerro. In December of the same year, after a spell that included 16 Uruguayan Primera División matches without one loss, he left.

International career
An intermittent Uruguay full international (one match in 1994, another in 1998 and two in 2004), Correa previously represented the nation at the 1993 FIFA World Youth Championship. He made his debut for the senior team on 19 October 1994 (aged 20), in a friendly match with Peru in the Estadio Nacional José Díaz in Lima, replacing Darío Silva in the 78th minute of the 1–0 win.

In 2004, as he was a Mallorca player at the service of the national team, Correa tested positive for cocaine and was suspended for one year, also being immediately released by Atlético. Upon appeal, it was reduced to nine months.

Honours
Atlético Madrid
La Liga: 1995–96
Copa del Rey: 1995–96
Segunda División: 2001–02

References

External links

National team data 

1974 births
Living people
Footballers from Montevideo
Uruguayan footballers
Association football forwards
Uruguayan Primera División players
Club Atlético River Plate (Montevideo) players
Peñarol players
La Liga players
Segunda División players
Atlético Madrid footballers
Racing de Santander players
RCD Mallorca players
Real Valladolid players
Chinese Super League players
Shanghai Shenhua F.C. players
Uruguay under-20 international footballers
Uruguay international footballers
Uruguayan expatriate footballers
Expatriate footballers in Spain
Expatriate footballers in China
Uruguayan expatriate sportspeople in Spain
Uruguayan expatriate sportspeople in China
Uruguayan sportspeople in doping cases
Doping cases in association football
Uruguayan football managers
Uruguayan Primera División managers
C.A. Cerro managers